Heart of Stone (German: Das kalte Herz) is a 1924 German silent film directed by Fred Sauer and starring Fritz Schulz, Grete Reinwald and Frida Richard. The film is based on a fairy tale by Wilhelm Hauff.

The film's sets were designed by the art director Siegfried Wroblewsky.

Cast
 Fritz Schulz as Peter Munk 
 Grete Reinwald as Lisbeth 
 Frida Richard
 Heinrich Peer
 Philipp Manning
 Paul Walker
 Victor Costa
 Gustav Trautschold
 Edith Penner
 Harry Berber

See also
Heart of Stone (1950)

References

Bibliography
 Bock, Hans-Michael & Bergfelder, Tim. The Concise CineGraph. Encyclopedia of German Cinema. Berghahn Books, 2009.

External links

1924 films
1920s fantasy films
German fantasy films
Films of the Weimar Republic
Films directed by Fred Sauer
German silent feature films
German black-and-white films
Films based on works by Wilhelm Hauff
Films based on short fiction
Films set in the 18th century
Films about wish fulfillment
1920s German-language films
Silent horror films
1920s German films